Expeditie Robinson: Strijd der Titanen (also known as Expeditie Robinson: Battle of the Titans), was a special All-Stars season of the Dutch/Belgian version of the Swedish show Expedition Robinson, or Survivor as it is referred to in some countries. This season began airing in March 2006 and concluded in July of that year. This season began with a surprise "plank" challenge in which the winner would automatically be immune from the first elimination and would be one of two contestants to be "leaders" of a tribe. As the winner of this challenge Ilona van der Laan, along with Veronique De Pryker, who Ilona picked as the person she got along with the least, picked their tribes from the fifteen other contestants. The last person not picked, Björn Lemeirel, was eliminated from the game. Another twist occurred in episode four when each tribe was asked to pick one player that they trusted the most. The North team chose Melvin Pigot, while the South team chose Richard Mackowia. These two contestants were both sent to a secret island called Entatula where the merge tribe of Panga would live. Eventually those living on the island had chosen all but Fleur Roozenburg, Lydia Guiso, Maxime Verbist, Ryan van Esch, and Veronique De Pryker to join them, they composed the Miniloc tribe and were forced to take part in a series of duels until only one remained and would return to the game. When it came time for the final four, the contestants took part in a couple of final challenges in order to determine who would be the finalists. The first of these challenges was won by Jennifer Smit while the second was won by Ryan van Esch. Ultimately, it was Ryan van Esch who won this season over Jennifer Smit by a jury vote of 4-2.

Finishing order

Voting history

 As both Douwe and Jakobien received two votes at the third tribal council, there was a re-vote in order to determine who would be eliminated. During said re-vote any member of the South team could receive votes.

 As both Karin and Pieter received three votes at the sixth tribal council, the number of votes received at previous tribal councils was used to determine who would be eliminated.

External links
(Contestant Profiles, Episode Summaries, and Voting History)

Expeditie Robinson seasons